Tomás Moreno Romero, better known as Tomasito, is a Spanish flamenco dancer, singer and rapper born in Jerez de la Frontera, Spain, in 1969. His music style is a very personal mixture of flamenco, pop, rock, hip hop, funky, and other rhythms. He is the son of Bastiana, also flamencodancer.

Albums 

Some of his albums are:

 Torrotrón
 Tomasito
 Castaña
 Cositas de la realidad
 Y de lo mío ¿qué?

Collaborations 

He has recorded songs with Kiko Veneno, Muchachito Bombo Infierno y Los Delinqüentes, Pastora Soler, Rosendo and Raimundo Amador among others.

References

External links 

 Interview in "Las 1001 noches" at Canal Sur
 Space at myspace.com
 Tomasito proxy company

Flamenco-rock
People from Jerez de la Frontera
1969 births
Living people
Singers from Andalusia